The 3"/70 Mark 26 Gun was developed to protect United States warships from Japanese kamikaze attacks in World War II, based on the 3"/50 caliber gun.  The name indicates in US Navy terminology that this piece of naval artillery fires a projectile  in diameter and has a barrel length of 70 calibers [barrel length = 3" × 70 = ].

History
The 3"/70 Mark 26 gun saw its development when the US Navy realized that the Oerlikon 20 mm cannon and the Bofors 40 mm artillery were too small to kill-stop Japanese kamikaze planes.  As a joint project between the United States and the United Kingdom, its design being finalized in 1956, the Mark 26 missed any wartime action. It was an essential improvement over the previous version, the 3"/50 Marks 27, 33, and 34, increasing the barrel length by 60 inches and improving range by over 5,000 feet (approximately 1,500 meters) and elevation by 5 degrees.  The 3" round was chosen because it was the smallest ammunition that could still be equipped with a VT radar proximity fuze.  The twin barrel mount was believed to be more effective against faster aircraft and guided missiles than the single mounted 5"/54 caliber Mark 42 gun, hence, the single barrel version of the Mark 26 never saw service use.

Versions
The Mark 26 was the last of four versions of the 3"/50 caliber AA (anti-aircraft) artillery. The next version (Mark 24) was exactly the same despite an overall weight loss of the actual gun. The Mark 25's improvement was based on a rapid-fire horizontal-wedge breech. The final, and service ready, version incorporated all of these improvements (with the exception of being much heavier than the Mark 24 version) as well as a water cooled monoblock system with a horizontally sliding breech mechanism.

Ammunition

The ammunition used in the Mark 26 is heavier than its earlier 3" rounds used by the US Navy.  Although it was a joint project by the United States and the United Kingdom, the two countries used cartridges that differed slightly.

Usage
escort destroyers: , 
command cruiser: 
light cruiser: CL-154-class cruiser (canceled)

Notes

References 
 
Tony DiGiulian, United States of America 3"/70 (7.62 cm) Mark 37
Tony DiGiulian, United States of America 3"/50 (7.62 cm) Mark 27, 33, and 34
 

World War II anti-aircraft guns
Naval anti-aircraft guns
Naval guns of the United States
76 mm artillery
Military equipment introduced in the 1950s